The Pratt & Whitney R-2180-A Twin Hornet was a radial engine developed in the United States by Pratt & Whitney. It had two rows of seven cylinders each.

Applications
 Douglas DC-4E
 North American XB-21
 Republic P-44 Rocket
 Stearman XA-21

Specifications (R-2180-A)

See also

References

External links
 Aerofiles Reciprocating Engines page
 https://web.archive.org/web/20160411162935/http://www.enginehistory.org/P%26W/R-2180/R-2180Index.pdf

1930s aircraft piston engines
Aircraft air-cooled radial piston engines
R-2180